The 1978–79 NBA season was the Warriors' 33rd season in the NBA and 16th in the San Francisco Bay Area.

Draft picks

Roster

Regular season

Season standings

z - clinched division title
y - clinched division title
x - clinched playoff spot

Record vs. opponents

References

Golden State Warriors seasons
Golden State
Golden
Golden